Yaxun Bʼalam III (also known as 6-Tun-Bird-Jaguar) was a high king of the Mayan city Yaxchilan from 631 until 681.

Family and Name 
Yaxun Bʼalam's father was Kʼinich Tatbu Skull III. The name of his mother is unknown.

Yaxun married Lady Pacal (sister of Lady Xoc), and their son, Itzamnaaj Bʼalam II, succeeded him as king.

It is generally believed that Bʼalam is the third Yaxun Bʼalam; "6-Tun" was later added to the glyph of his name, distinguishing him from his grandson, Yaxun Bʼalam IV (also known as Bird Jaguar IV).

Reign 
Bʼalam ruled Yaxchilan from 631 to 681.

On the stairs of Temple 33, he is depicted as being on the eighth step playing ball on the date August 27, 636.

In either 646 or 647, Bʼalam captured a lord from the Hix Witz polity, a Maya center. He noted the capital of the Hix Witz polity was located at Zapote Bobal during that time.

References

Bibliography

7th-century monarchs in North America
Rulers of Yaxchilan
681 deaths
Year of birth unknown